Robert Liparulo is an American former journalist  turned author living in Monument, Colorado. His publications include a short story contributed to James Patterson's short story compilation, Thriller.

Early life and education
Liparulo was born in West Point, New York. He attended Weber State University in Utah.

Bibliography

Thrillers

Standalone novels
 Comes a Horseman (2005)
 Germ (2006)

John Hutchinson novels
 Deadfall (2007)
 Deadlock (2009)

Immortal Files novels
 The 13th Tribe (2012)
 The Judgment Stone (2013)

Young adult

The Dreamhouse Kings series
 House of Dark Shadows (2008)
 Watcher in the Woods (2008)
 Gatekeepers (2009)
 Timescape (2009)
 Whirlwind (2009)
 Frenzy (2010)

Short stories
 Kill Zone (2006), published in Thriller: Stories to Keep You Up All Night (edited by James Patterson)

References

External links
 

Living people
Year of birth missing (living people)
Weber State University alumni
People from Monument, Colorado